Dublanc is a village in Saint Peter parish on the west coast of Dominica between the town of Portsmouth and the village of Bioche. It sits on a low hillside at an elevation of 27.  it had a population of 423.

The Dublanc river, which rises on the flanks of Morne Diablotin (the tallest mountain in Dominica), cuts through the village just before entering the Caribbean Sea.

Industry
Dublanc is a rural village; many residents farm and fish for their livelihood.

Amenities
Catholic church
Seventh-Day Adventist Church
Pre-School
Primary School

Sports
The village continues to do well in sporting events in Dominica, mainly football and cricket.

Some Past Residents
Irvine Shillingford, a local cricketer

References

Populated places in Dominica
Saint Peter Parish, Dominica